Sreemurukan is a 1977 Indian Malayalam-language film, directed and produced by P. Subramaniam. The film, based on the stories of the Hindu god Kartikeya, also called as Murugan, stars Kaviyoor Ponnamma, Thikkurissy Sukumaran Nair, P. C. George and Hari. The film has musical score by G. Devarajan.

Cast

Ravikumar as Murugan
Kaviyoor Ponnamma as Kamalakshi
Thikkurissy Sukumaran Nair as Padmanabha Pilla
P. C. George as Temple Manager
Hari as Naradan
Kedamangalam Sadanandan as Madhavan Pilla
Raghavan 
Adoor Bhavani 
Anandavally as Lakshmi
Aranmula Ponnamma as Bharathi
Aroor Sathyan
Baby Sumathi as child Murugan
Chavara V. P. Nair as Broker Pilla 
Dr. Namboothiri as Devendran
Gemini Ganesan as Shivan
Rajasree as Rajeswari
Master Raghu  as adolescent Murugan 
Ushakumari as Amritavalli, Valli
Vanchiyoor Madhavan Nair as Murugadas
Kottarakkara Sreedharan Nair as Nambi Rajavu
Kalashala Babu as Sukumaran

Soundtrack
The music was composed by G. Devarajan.

References

External links
  
 

1977 films
1970s Malayalam-language films